"Good Old-Fashioned Lover Boy" is the eighth track from the British rock band Queen's 1976 album A Day at the Races, written by Freddie Mercury. It was also released as a single in 1977 on 7-inch vinyl. It was one of several British music hall-inspired songs composed by members of the band. It reached number 17 on the UK Singles Chart.

Background and composition

The song begins with a piano and vocal introduction by Mercury, then continues, with the bass and drums adding on, at the start of the chorus. The second verse is sung, followed by another chorus. At this point, the drums, bass and guitar drop out, which then leads into the bridge, sung by Mercury and Mike Stone ("Hey boy where'd you get it from, Hey boy where did you go?"). Following the Brian May guitar solo, another verse is sung, and then the chorus ends the track.

The song describes how "a good old-fashioned lover boy" is looking forward to a night of revelry and romance.

Live performances and other appearances

It was partially mimed by the band for the BBC and aired on Top of the Pops. The Top of the Pops version also has drummer Roger Taylor singing Mike Stone's line.

The song was also performed live from A Day at the Races Tour until the end of the News of the World Tour. It was performed in a medley after "Killer Queen", and was the first two verses, followed by the final chorus.

Personnel
Freddie Mercury - lead and backing vocals, piano
Brian May - electric guitar, backing vocals
Roger Taylor - drums, triangle, woodblocks, backing vocals
John Deacon - bass
Mike Stone - additional vocals

Certifications

References

External links
 
 Lyrics at Queen official website
 Queenpedia - detailed worldwide release information

Queen (band) songs
1976 songs
1977 singles
Songs written by Freddie Mercury
EMI Records singles
Elektra Records singles
Hollywood Records singles
Glam rock songs
Music hall songs